Gulnara Kusherbayeva (born 31 August 1971) is a Kazakhstani judoka. She competed in the women's heavyweight event at the 2000 Summer Olympics.

References

1971 births
Living people
Kazakhstani female judoka
Olympic judoka of Kazakhstan
Judoka at the 2000 Summer Olympics
People from Aktobe